The year 1675 in music involved some significant events.

Events
Agostino Steffani is appointed court organist at Munich.
Johann Krieger performs at Vienna, and is rewarded by Leopold I, Holy Roman Emperor.

Publications
Gaspar Sanz – Instrucción de música sobre la guitarra española, Libre 2

Classical music
Johann Rudolph Ahle – Toccata ex Clave D
Marc-Antoine Charpentier
 Ave maris stella, H.60
 De Profundis, H.232
Christian Geist – Laudet Deum mea
Guillaume-Gabriel Nivers – 3e livre d'orgue des huit tons de l'église, organ collection
Maria Xaveria Perucona – Sacri Concerti de Mottetti, Op.1
Johann Christoph Pezel – Bicinia variorum instrumentorum
Alessandro Stradella – Qual prodigio è ch'io miri, a serenata

Opera

 Matthew Locke – Psyche
 Giovanni Legrenzi – La divisione del mondo
 Jean-Baptiste Lully – Thésée, LWV 5

Births
July 12 – Evaristo Felice Dall'Abaco, Italian composer (died 1742)
August 1 – William Williams, composer (died 1701)
date unknown – Louis de La Coste, composer (died 1750)
probable
Michel de La Barre, composer (died 1745)
Giovanni Porta, opera composer (died 1755)
Tommaso Redi, composer

Deaths
March 23 – Anthoni van Noordt, Dutch organist and composer (born 1619)
September 5 – Carlos Patiño, composer (born 1600)
October 29 – Andreas Hammerschmidt, organist and composer (born c.1611)
November 14 – Johannes Khuen, priest, poet and composer (born 1606)
 date unknown – Wojciech Bobowski, Polish Ottoman musician (born 1610)

 
17th century in music
Music by year